A cheap seat is usually a high up seat in a venue or an arena where the ticket is sold at less expensive prices. The cheap seat is also commonly referred to as the "nosebleed section" of a venue.

Cheap Seats may refer to:

 Cheap Seats (album), by Alabama, 1993
 "Cheap Seats" (song), by Dallas Smith, 2014
 Cheap Seats (TV series), a television program broadcast on ESPN Classic
 "Cheap Seats", a 2020 song by Illy featuring Waax from the album The Space Between

See also
 The Cheap Seats (disambiguation)